A Panzer is an armored fighting vehicle, most often German tanks in World War II.

Panzer may also refer to:

Gaming
Panzer Digest, a wargaming periodical
Panzer (video game), a 1977 edition of Panther

Music
Panzer (Chilean band), a heavy metal band
Panzer (Brazilian band), a thrash metal band
Panzer AG, a Norwegian rock band

Other uses
Panzer (surname)
Panzer, Shopian, a village in India
 Erik Hagen or Panzer (born 1975), Norwegian soccer player

See also